Molesworth is a rural residential locality in the local government area of Derwent Valley in the South-east region of Tasmania. The 2016 census determined a population of 633 for the state suburb of Molesworth.

History
Molesworth was gazetted as a locality in 1970.

Geography
The boundaries of the locality are almost all survey lines.

Road infrastructure
The C615 route (Molesworth Road) enters from the north-west and runs through to the south-east, where it exits.

References

Localities of Derwent Valley Council
Towns in Tasmania